Frank Eckels Beltzhoover (November 6, 1841 – June 2, 1923) was a Democratic member of the U.S. House of Representatives from Pennsylvania.

Frank E. Beltzhoover was born in Silver Spring Township, Pennsylvania.  He attended Big Spring Academy in Newville, Pennsylvania.  He graduated from Pennsylvania College at Gettysburg in 1862, where he was a member of Phi Kappa Psi fraternity.  He studied law, was admitted to the bar in 1864 and commenced practice in Carlisle, Pennsylvania.  He served as chairman of the Democratic committee of Cumberland County in 1868 and 1873.  He was district attorney from 1874 to 1877.  He was a delegate to the 1876 Democratic National Convention.

Beltzhoover was elected as a Democrat to the Forty-sixth and Forty-seventh Congresses.  He was not a candidate for renomination in 1882.  He was again elected to the Fifty-second and Fifty-third Congresses.  He served as chairman of the United States House Committee on War Claims during the Fifty-second and Fifty-third Congresses.  He was not a candidate for renomination in 1894.

He resumed the practice of law in Carlisle until 1910, when he moved to Los Angeles, California.  He lived in retirement until his death on June 2, 1923. He was interred in Ashland Cemetery in Carlisle, Pennsylvania.

Sources

The Political Graveyard

References

1841 births
1923 deaths
Pennsylvania lawyers
People from Carlisle, Pennsylvania
Democratic Party members of the United States House of Representatives from Pennsylvania
19th-century American lawyers